The Centre for Distance Learning & Innovation or CDLI is a branch of the Newfoundland and Labrador Department of Education responsible for providing efficient education opportunities to students living in remote areas.

History
CDLI was founded in December 2000 following the recommendations of the 1999 Sparks-Williams Ministerial Panel on Educational Delivery.

Previous to its creation, distance learning and education in Newfoundland and Labrador had been an expensive and difficult undertaking.  Due to all teacher-student communications being telephone based and all texts being in print, updating information and adding new students to the program became both time consuming and expensive.

Currently, CDLI is primarily computer and internet based. The network formed following its creation allows instant updating of texts, and webpage based education reduces the need for scheduled sessions with remote teachers.

Starting in the 2002 school year many schools made e-courses available through the Centre. These courses use the same curriculum as classroom-based education but are available to students whose schools may not offer courses they wish to take or are required for certain professions.

Technology
The primary technological resource of CDLI is the internet which facilitates its other aspects.
Headsets are used for vocal communication
Webcams are used for visual teaching
Tablets are used to communicate writing
Desire2Learn is used for asynchronous communication
Eluminate Live is used for synchronous communication via live web conferencing
Polycoms are now being introduced into some schools to give the distance ed teachers a means to visually monitor their students while in class
Mostly proprietary software is used, although some software is based on the GNU GPL.

Services
There are students who are "e-tutors" and they provide tutoring via E-live or are e-tutors in the schools themselves to help new students and teachers get introduced into using the technology. Materials needed are sometimes provided by CDLI and shipped by postal mail. A student survival guide is also provided as is a guidance room and many lunch-time presentations from nearby universities and so on. Multimedia learning objects or "mLos" are provided by teachers as "learning clips" or "mini-classes" for students seeking help outside of class. The general software used is Internet Explorer, Mozilla Firefox, Desire2Learn, Adobe Flash, PDF files, Windows Media Files and other media-type files, and Sun Java is used. Chemsketch is used for chemical molecular modelling, as is Ti-83+ interface software and of course word processing software is also used. There is a wide variety of software that is used. There is also a math league, a math club were students compete in solving mathematical problems.

Courses offered
CDLI Courses
Academic Mathematics 2204
Academic Mathematics 3103
Academic Mathematics 3204
Advanced Mathematics 2205
Advanced Mathematics 3205
Advanced Mathematics 3207
AP Psychology 4220
Art & Design 3200
Art Technologies 1201
Biology 2201
Biology 3201
Canadian Economy 2203
Canadian History 1201
Career Development 2201
Chemistry 2202
Chemistry 3202
Communications Technology 2104/3104
English 1201
English 2201
English 3201
Enterprise Education 3205
Environmental Science 3215
Experiencing Music 2200
French 2200
French 3200
French 3201
Healthy Living 1200
Integrated Systems 1205
Mathematics 1204
Physics 2204
Physics 3204
Science 1206
World Geography 3202
World History 3201
Writing 2203
CDLI Resource Courses
AP Biology 4221
AP Chemistry 4222
AP Math 4225
AP Physics 4224
Career Exploration 1100
Human Dynamics 2201
Intermediate Technology Education—Control
Science 2200

Scope
Access to CDLI is freely available to all students. While communication with teachers is mostly reserved for distance learners, students in urban settings may also benefit from web-based course information and lessons.

External links
 CDLI Home

Distance education institutions based in Canada
Educational organizations based in Newfoundland and Labrador